Democedes of Croton, described in The Histories of Herodotus as "the most skillful physician of his time".

Democedes's background
Democedes was a Greek physician and a member of the court of Darius I. He was born in Croton, in southern Italy. His father was Calliphon, a priest and physician at Croton at the time of Pythagoras. His first position as physician seems to be in civil service of Athens and Aegina. Later he entered service under Polycrates. In 522 B.C., Polycrates, his entourage, and Democedes were all captured as Lydians by Oroetes and sent to Susa.

Democedes's travels
Herodotus describes the journeys of Democedes with much detail.

Services rendered to Darius and Atossa
Darius once sprained his ankle while he was hunting, and his Egyptian doctors could not help his ankle.  However, Democedes was able to heal his ankle, and he was thereafter given great esteem. The court regarded his actions highly enough that he was able to eat in the presence of the king. He was the first of many Greek physicians to be within the Persian court. He lived in what the Persians regarded as luxury. Nevertheless, he always wanted to go back to his homeland, Greece. Later on, Darius's wife, Atossa, had a breast ulcer. Democedes' interaction with Atossa represents the first recorded diagnosis and treatment of inflammatory mastitis. When Democedes cured her, as a reward, he was set free and allowed to visit Greece.

Escape
He went to Greece as passenger on one ship of a reconnaissance mission for a later military campaign. Three Phoenician ships were sent with fifteen Persian nobles. Through the latter half of the mission, the fleet stopped in Tarentum, where Democedes made his escape with help from the Tarentian king. After his escape he went back to Croton. He was guarded from the Persians, and later married a daughter of Milon.

References

Sources
The Histories of Herodotus

Further reading

6th-century BC Greek physicians
Ancient Crotonians
Ancient Greek emigrants to the Achaemenid Empire